The Zimbabwe cricket team toured England in the 2003 season to play a two-match Test series against England. England won the series 2–0 with no matches drawn. England's James Anderson made his Test debut in the first match of the series, taking a five-wicket haul. The two teams were also involved in a triangular One Day International tournament with South Africa.

Tour matches

First-class: British Universities v Zimbabweans

First-class: Worcestershire v Zimbabweans

First-class: Sussex v Zimbabweans

First-class: Middlesex v Zimbabweans

50-over: Somerset v Zimbabweans

50-over: Hampshire v Zimbabweans

50-over: Essex v Zimbabweans

Test series

1st Test

2nd Test

NatWest Series

1st match: England v Zimbabwe

3rd match: South Africa v Zimbabwe

4th match: England v Zimbabwe

6th match: South Africa v Zimbabwe

7th match: England v Zimbabwe

9th match: South Africa v Zimbabwe

References

Sources
 Playfair Cricket Annual 2004
 Wisden Cricketers' Almanack 2004

External links
 CricketArchive

2003 in English cricket
2003
International cricket competitions in 2003
2003 in Zimbabwean cricket